Al'Malik Demichia Herring (born November 9, 1997) is an American football defensive end for the Kansas City Chiefs of the National Football League (NFL). He played college football at Georgia and was signed by the Chiefs as an undrafted free agent in 2021.

Early life and education
Malik Herring was born on November 9, 1997, in Forsyth, Georgia. He attended Mary Persons High School there, becoming a four-star recruit following graduation. He was recruited to over twenty schools, choosing Georgia. As a freshman in 2017, Herring played in all 15 games, recording seven total stops. He appeared in 14 games the following year, compiling 24 stops and two assisted sacks. He appeared in 12 of 14 games as a junior, starting nine. He was given Georgia's "Defensive Most Improved Player Award" following the season. He was starting defensive end for eight of the team's ten games as a senior. He finished the year with 20 tackles.

Professional career
After going unselected in the 2021 NFL Draft, Herring was signed as an undrafted free agent by the Kansas City Chiefs. He was placed on the reserve/non-football injury list to start the season, as he was recovering from a torn ACL suffered in practices for the college football Senior Bowl.

He made his NFL debut in week three, making two tackles in the 20–17 loss to the Indianapolis Colts. Herring won Super Bowl LVII when the Chiefs defeated the Philadelphia Eagles 38-35.

References

Further reading
 
 
 
 

1997 births
Living people
Players of American football from Georgia (U.S. state)
Georgia Bulldogs football players
American football defensive linemen
Kansas City Chiefs players